Dante Arevalo Ang Sr. is a Filipino journalist, the chairman emeritus and owner of The Manila Times. His son, Dante "Klink" Ang II is presently chairman and chief executive officer of The Times.

Career 
From 1993 until 2003, Ang worked as a publicist for President Gloria Macapagal Arroyo. In December 2005, he was appointed chair of the Commission on Filipinos Overseas, staying in the post until 30 June 2010.

In 2001, Ang bought The Manila Times from its previous owner, Mark Jimenez. He was appointed as Chairman Emeritus of the newspaper by the family board. President Rodrigo Duterte named him special envoy for international public relations on 3 May 2017.

In April 2019, he published an article which claimed there were plans to oust Duterte, accusing several media and legal groups of destabilization attempts. He was accused by the Philippine Center for Investigative Journalism (one of the accused groups) of being "wrong on many counts" with his claims.

References

Living people
Filipino journalists
Year of birth missing (living people)
The Manila Times
Filipino publishers (people)